Montanha Russa Park is a suburban park in Nossa Senhora de Fátima, Macau, China, with a collection of local and European trees.

The park also has a Portuguese restaurant near the front gates.

See also
 List of tourist attractions in Macau

References

External links
 Montanha Russa Park – webpage by the Municipal Affairs Bureau 

Urban public parks in Macau